Gian-Marco Crameri (born December 13, 1972) is a Swiss professional ice hockey coach who currently coaches the Switzerland women's national ice hockey team.

Crameri has participated as a member of the Swiss national team in numerous international tournaments, including the 2002 Winter Olympics.

Career statistics

Regular season and playoffs

International

External links

Living people
Swiss ice hockey defencemen
1972 births
Ice hockey players at the 2002 Winter Olympics
Olympic ice hockey players of Switzerland
EHC Olten players
HC Davos players
HC Lugano players
ZSC Lions players
EV Zug players
Genève-Servette HC players